"Pit of Peril" is the second episode of Thunderbirds, a British Supermarionation television series created by Gerry and Sylvia Anderson and filmed by their production company AP Films (APF) for ITC Entertainment. Written by Alan Fennell and directed by Desmond Saunders, it was first broadcast on 7 October 1965 on ATV Midlands.

Set in the 2060s, the series follows the missions of International Rescue, a secret organisation that uses technologically advanced rescue vehicles to save human life. The main characters are ex-astronaut Jeff Tracy, founder of International Rescue, and his five adult sons, who pilot the organisation's primary vehicles – the Thunderbird machines. In "Pit of Peril", International Rescue rush to save the crew of the Sidewinder, an experimental US Army walker that has fallen into an abandoned military waste dump.

Prior to the episode's first broadcast, the Sidewinder had already appeared in TV Century 21 as part of the comic's regular Stingray strip. In 1991, the episode was adapted into a two-part strip for Fleetway Publications' Thunderbirds: The Comic.

Plot
The Sidewinder is a giant walker developed by the US Army for use in brushfire wars. During a field test in Africa, disaster strikes when the Sidewinder disturbs the crust that has formed above a burning pit, creating a fissure that swallows the vehicle. The Sidewinder comes to rest hundreds of feet below ground, on its side and unable to move. Its crew of three – Colonel Sweeney, Frank and Johnny – are unhurt but their air and other life support systems are failing and the outside temperature is rising rapidly.

An air support unit comprising a helicopter crew and the Sidewinder relief crew evaluate the situation. The leader, General Peters, states that the Sidewinder weighs over 500 tons and the equipment needed to lift it would take weeks to arrive. Lieutenant Mead volunteers to be hoisted into the pit to assess the Sidewinder's condition but can only glimpse the vehicle before he is overwhelmed by the heat and forced to withdraw. A plan is devised to set the Sidewinder upright using the helicopter, so that the machine may be able to climb to the surface, and Sergeant Reynolds goes in to attach a line to one of the legs. He succeeds, but also emerges from the pit badly burned. Mead and Reynolds are airlifted to hospital in the relief crew's helijet. The Sidewinder proves too heavy for the helicopter and the line slips free during the rescue attempt.

Prompted by his aide, Ralph, Peters sends out an emergency call to International Rescue. The transmission is picked up by John (voiced by Ray Barrett) on the Thunderbird 5 space station and relayed to Tracy Island. Jeff (voiced by Peter Dyneley) immediately dispatches Scott (Shane Rimmer) in Thunderbird 1, followed by Virgil and Brains (David Holliday and David Graham) in Thunderbird 2 carrying the Mole and two Recovery Vehicles. Reaching the scene, the team survey the pit using Thunderbird 1s remote camera, which sights old army wreckage. They determine that the pit was originally an open-cast mine which was converted into a military waste dump after World War II; some time after the pit was abandoned, the wreckage spontaneously combusted, thus leaving a gigantic cavity beneath the newly formed top-soil. Brains predicts that if the rest of the top-soil crust over the pit is removed, the Recovery Vehicles will be able to drag the Sidewinder out of the pit.

Wearing a protective suit, Virgil enters the pit and plants explosives around the perimeter. He is then retrieved by Scott in the Mole. Brains detonates the explosives, successfully blowing away the remaining crust. Virgil activates the Recovery Vehicles and fires their magnetic tow cables onto the Sidewinder. He then puts the vehicles in reverse, slowly hauling the Sidewinder out. One of the cables breaks loose, so Virgil re-attaches it. Finally, the Sidewinder clears the pit.

Sweeney, Frank and Johnny recover from their ordeal and are airlifted to hospital in a medical craft. As International Rescue depart, a grateful Peters wishes that the Tracys were in his army.

Production
"Pit of Peril" is one of several early Thunderbirds episodes that were originally 25 minutes long but subsequently extended to 50 minutes after Lew Grade – APF's owner and financial backer, who had been highly impressed by the 25-minute pilot version of "Trapped in the Sky" – ordered that the running time be doubled so that Thunderbirds would fill an hour-long TV timeslot. For "Pit of Peril", this involved adding new supporting elements in the form of the relief helijet and its crew (Lieutenant Mead, Sergeant Reynolds and Pilot Charlie) as well as a subplot in which the army personnel attempt to recover the Sidewinder using their own equipment before calling International Rescue. Continuity errors in the design of the army helicopter cockpit set distinguish the episode's original footage from the new scenes filmed during the re-shoot.

"Pit of Peril" features only five of the regular puppet cast: Jeff, Scott, Virgil and John Tracy, and Brains. This is the lowest number of any Thunderbirds episode. The episode is also the only one of the series that does not have any female characters. The puppets that play Colonel Sweeney and Frank first appeared as Fireflashs Captain Hanson and his unnamed co-pilot in "Trapped in the Sky".

A scene set inside the pit uses camera movement and a carefully timed edit to give the impression that the Virgil puppet and scale model of the Mole are in the same shot, even though they were filmed by different units: when the camera pans away from the effects unit's shot of the Mole, its view passes through thick smoke, hiding a cut separating this footage from the puppet unit's shot of Virgil.

The episode was disliked by Gerry Anderson, who found it one of the most challenging episodes to make. In his biography, he described it as "an absolute pig of a film. For three weeks I kept cutting and re-cutting because we couldn't get it right. One night I said to the editor, 'Let it go. Cut the negative and dub it – we can't do anything more with this.'" Several weeks later, he was surprised when Abe Mandell, head of ITC's New York office, telephoned him after seeing the finished episode and called it "wonderful".

This episode marks the first use of Thunderbirds regular ending theme music: a modified version of the instrumental that accompanies the launch of Thunderbird 1 in "Trapped in the Sky". The incidental music for "Pit of Peril", composed by Barry Gray, was recorded on 24 April 1965 in a four-hour studio session with a 22-piece orchestra.

Design
The Sidewinder's look was designed by director Desmond Saunders. The studio model used wood and card for the main body and chains of cake tins for the arms. According to special effects director Derek Meddings, the model was extremely difficult to film as it was hung on wires and an under-floor "scissor mechanism" was needed to move its legs. In his book 21st Century Visions, he commented that "fortunately the script required it to fall into a deep pit within minutes of appearing, so we didn't have to move it far." The Sidewinder control room set incorporated a console normally seen aboard Thunderbird 5.

"Pit of Peril" marks the first appearance of the Mole, which is also featured in the closing credits of this and all subsequent episodes. Its drill bit was made of wood fitted with a screw thread; the wood had to be turned manually as the effects team did not have a lathe. The simple interior set, which incorporated the Mobile Control console used by Scott, was embellished for future appearances. The episode also introduces Thunderbird 1s remote camera and the helijet, a type of VTOL aircraft that appears frequently in Thunderbirds and later Anderson series. The Recovery Vehicles, which do not appear in any other episodes, were designed by effects assistant Mike Trim in his first major design work for APF.

Broadcast and reception
In the series' alternative two-part format that was broadcast in some UK regions, part one of "Pit of Peril" ended with Thunderbird 1 blasting off from Tracy Island while part two began with an abridged version of a scene in which the army personnel discuss the situation while standing at the edge of the pit. Several other scenes were also shortened.

Critical response
In her autobiography, Sylvia Anderson called the episode's theme of danger posed by hazardous waste "very much a contemporary problem". Tom Fox of Starburst magazine rates the episode three out of five, calling the Sidewinder a "great but hilariously awkward invention" and likening it to the giant mechanical spider in the film Wild Wild West (1999).

Simon Archer and Marcus Hearn describe "Pit of Peril" as one of several early Thunderbirds episodes that focus on "seemingly inescapable dangers on land, under the sea and in the air". For Chris Bentley, it is one of a number that use "incredible technology in a developing world as a springboard to disaster". Hearn praises the model-work, editing and music but calls the episode a "misfire", stating that Fennell's "relatively one-dimensional plot" was ill-suited to a longer, 50-minute running time. He compares the plot to that of Series Two's "Path of Destruction" but regards that episode as superior in nearly all respects. Bentley and Hearn also argue that the premise is similar to that of "Trapped in the Sky". Bentley writes that "Pit of Peril" "somewhat slavishly follows the formula" of its precursor, comparing the plight of the experimental Sidewinder to the sabotage of the new Fireflash airliner. He considers the Mole to be "lifted directly" from the Edgar Rice Burroughs novel At The Earth's Core (1914).

The Star Observer compares "Pit of Peril" favourably to the first episode but criticises its lack of female characters. In an essay analysing Thunderbirds along gender lines, Ian Haywood believes that the Sidewinder's fall into the pit reflects a broader conflict in the series between "masculine" science and "maternal" nature. According to Haywood, the army walker's undoing literally shows that "Mother Nature will not be walked over. Is this the transmogrified mother taking her revenge, or is she continuing her role as society's moral conscience?" Nicholas J. Cull views the Sidewinder's defeat by a 20th-century military dump as symbolic of "the way in which the political residue of one war can dog a future generation." He also considers the reference to brushfires "topical" for a TV episode made "in the opening years of the Vietnam conflict".

In a review of the series' soundtrack, Heather Phares of AllMusic cites the incidental piece "The Fate of the Sidewinder" as an example of how Barry Gray's work on Thunderbirds "[sent] up the spy and action/adventure conventions of the '60s very stylishly and subtly." She characterises the track as "only slightly more over the top than the scores for the James Bond films or for TV series like The Prisoner".

References

Works cited

External links

"Pit of Peril" at TheVervoid.com

1965 British television episodes
Fiction about the United States Army
Television episodes set in Africa
Thunderbirds (TV series) episodes